Kontraritam (trans. Counterrhythm) was a former Yugoslav 2 Tone/ska band from Novi Sad.

History 
The band was formed in Autumn 1980 by former Gomila G members Žolt Horvat (guitar), Robert "Robi" Radić (drums), Jan Pavlov (keyboards, vocals), Dimitrije "Mita" Radulović (bass guitar, vocals). The band also featured guitarist Sreten "Srele" Kovačević who left his former band Pekinška Patka after the release of their debut album Plitka poezija. Beside the guitar, Kovačević played saxophone, which he took up playing a few months before joining the band. After a few club appearances and with the help of Vitomir "Vita" Simurdić, the band managed to appear on the Festival Omladina. Even though the band did not win the festival, it got positive reactions from the audience and critics.

In December 1980, the band appeared at the Grok Festival, held at the Novi Sad fair. They also played as an opening act for Haustor, Prljavo Kazalište and Idoli. With the help of the producer Aleksandar "Aca" Pražić, the band recorded a few songs, which provided the media presentation of the band. The following year, after the performance at the Hipodrom Festival, Radulović, who went to serve the Yugoslav People's Army, was replaced by Boris "Bora" Oslovčan, Kovačević's former Pekinška Patka bandmate. Soon after, the band signed a contract with the Beograd Disk record label, but the material recorded for the debut album was released by Jugoton in June 1982. Kontraritam was recorded in the "Meta Sound" studio and featured the recordings of both Radulović and Oslovčan on bass. The recording of the track "Zdravo, kako si" ("Hello, How Are You") which the band recorded did not appear on the album and has remained unreleased until today.

In the meantime, the band changed several lineups, but frequently performed live. Their appearance with Obojeni Program and Grad at Dadov in Belgrade during September 1981 was one of their best performances with the band having three encore calls. During the early 1982 the band performed mainly in Novi Sad, but at the time the lineup changed, as Horvat and Oslovčan went to serve the army, and the new band member had become Luna drummer Ivan Fece "Firchie" as the new guitarist. Soon after, the band ceased to exist. The band was reformed by Kovačević, Pavlov, Radulović and the new drummer Predrag "Buca" Janičić and together they performed in local clubs until the Spring of 1983, when Kovačević went to serve the army and the band split up.

Post-breakup and legacy 
Horvat moved to Germany, Pavlov moved to Canada and Oslovčan moved to Russia, working as a chef in a restaurant in Moscow. Radić played with La Strada and Love Hunters and is currently the Veliki Prezir drummer. Radulović works in Elektrovojvodina and Kovačević formed his own company Audiokonstruktor. In 2008, Kovačević and Oslovčan performed a reunion show with their former band Pekinška Patka at Exit festival.

The song "Sretne noge" ("Happy Legs") appeared on the third place of Studio B Diskomer top ten list and the song "Žožo, vrati se" ("Žoža, come back") appeared on the Vrući dani i vrele noći various artists compilation. In 1994, the song "Sretne noge" appeared on the various artists compilation Niko kao ja - jugoslovenski novi talas. This is the only Kontraritam song released in compact disc format as the self-titled album was never rereleased on CD.

Discography

Studio albums

Other appearances

References 

EX YU ROCK enciklopedija 1960-2006, Janjatović Petar; 
 NS rockopedija, novosadska rock scena 1963-2003, Mijatović Bogomir, SWITCH, 2005

External links 
 Kontraritam at Discogs
 Kontraritam at Youtube
 Kontraritam at Last.fm
 Kontraritam at Rateyourmusic

See also 
 New wave music in Yugoslavia

 
 

Serbian rock music groups
Serbian new wave musical groups
Serbian ska musical groups
Yugoslav rock music groups
Musical groups from Novi Sad
Musical groups established in 1980
Musical groups disestablished in 1983